Albertus Odoricus Timmer (18 December 1859 – 26 April 1943) was a Dutch Catholic missionary prelate and bishop of the Roman Catholic Diocese of Lu'an from 1901 to 1927.

Biography
Albertus Odoricus Timmer was born in Haarlem, North Holland, Kingdom of the Netherlands, on 18 December 1859. He joined the Franciscans on 9 October 1881. He was ordained a priest on 10 March 1883. That same year, he was sent to the Qing Empire to preach, first in Hubei and then transferred to Shanxi. On 20 July 1901, he was appointed bishop of the Roman Catholic Diocese of Lu'an by the Holy See. He resigned on 20 August 1926.

On 8 December 1941, the Pacific War broke out. In 1943, Albertus Odoricus Timmer was detained by the Imperial Japanese Army in Taiyuan, and died on April 26.

References

1859 births
1943 deaths
People from Haarlem
Dutch Roman Catholic missionaries
Dutch Roman Catholic bishops
Chinese Roman Catholic bishops